Gérard Poirier  (4 February 1930 – 19 December 2021) was a Canadian actor and director.

Life and career
Born in Montreal in 1930, Poirier began acting in the theatre at the age of 12. He graduated from the Collège André-Grasset in 1952 and subsequently became a teacher at the Conservatoire d'art dramatique de Montréal, the Collège Lionel-Groulx, and the Collège Antoine-Girouard. His early acting career was in the theatre, particularly at the Théâtre du Rideau Vert and the Théâtre du Nouveau Monde. His archives are kept in the Bibliothèque et Archives nationales du Québec.

Poirier died in Montreal on 19 December 2021, at the age of 91.

Filmography

Film
The Rebels (Quelques arpents de neige) - 1972
 - 1974
Panic (Panique) - 1977
The Plouffe Family (Les Plouffe) - 1981
 - 1993
Matusalem - 1993
Meanwhile (Pendant ce temps...) - 1998
Wedding Night (Nuit de noces) - 2001
Stay with Me (Reste avec moi) - 2010
Henry - 2011

Television
Dateline (1955–1956)
Beau temps, mauvais temps (1955–1958)
Radisson (1957–1959)
D'Iberville (1967–1968)
Nic and Pic (1973)
He Shoots, He Scores (1989)
Un gars, une fille (1997)

Awards
Prix Gémeaux for Best Male Lead in a Drama or Comedy (1988)
Officer of the Order of Canada (1996)
Prix Gascon-Roux (1997)
Prix Gémeaux for best Male Supporting Role in a Soap Opera (2002)
Knight of the Order of La Pléiade (2006)
Officer of the National Order of Quebec (2007)

References

External links

 

1930 births
2021 deaths
French Quebecers
20th-century Canadian male actors
21st-century Canadian male actors
Film directors from Quebec
Male actors from Montreal
Officers of the Order of Canada
Knights of the National Order of Quebec